A cone is a basic geometrical shape.

Cone may also refer to:

Mathematics
Cone (category theory)
Cone (formal languages)
Cone (graph theory), a graph in which one vertex is adjacent to all others
Cone (linear algebra), a subset of vector space
Mapping cone (homological algebra)
Cone (topology)
Conic bundle, a concept in algebraic geometry
Conical surface, generated by a moving line with one fixed point
Projective cone, the union of all lines that intersect a projective subspace and an arbitrary subset of some other disjoint subspace

Computing
Cone (software), a text-based e-mail and news client for Unix-like operating systems
Cone tracing, a derivative of the ray-tracing algorithm that replaces rays, which have no thickness, with cones
Second-order cone programming, a library of routines that implements a predictor corrector variant of the semidefinite programming algorithm

Astronomy
Cone Nebula (also known as NGC 2264), an H II region in the constellation of Monoceros
Ionization cone, cones of material extending out from spiral galaxies

Engineering and physical science
Antenna blind cone, the volume of space that cannot be scanned by an antenna
Carbon nanocones, conical structures which are made predominantly from carbon and which have at least one dimension of the order one micrometer or smaller
Cone algorithm identifies surface particles quickly and accurately for three-dimensional clusters composed of discrete particles
Cone beam reconstruction, a method of X-ray scanning in microtomography
Cone calorimeter, a modern device used to study the fire behavior of small samples of various materials in condensed phase
Cone clutch serves the same purpose as a disk or plate clutch
Cone of depression occurs in an aquifer when groundwater is pumped from a well
Cone penetration test (CPT), an in situ testing method used to determine the geotechnical engineering properties of soils
Cone Penetrometer apparatus, an alternative method to the Casagrande Device in measuring the Liquid Limit of a soil sample
Conical intersection of two potential energy surfaces of the same spatial and spin symmetries
Conical measure, a type of graduated laboratory glassware with a conical cup and a notch on the top to facilitate pouring of liquids
Conical mill (or conical screen mill), a machine used to reduce the size of material in a uniform manner
Conical pendulum, a weight (or bob) fixed on the end of a string (or rod) suspended from a pivot
Conical scanning, a system used in early radar units to improve their accuracy
Helical cone beam computed tomography, a type of three-dimensional computed tomography
Hertzian cone, the cone of force that propagates through a brittle, amorphous or cryptocrystalline solid material from a point of impact
Nose cone, used to refer to the forwardmost section of a rocket, guided missile or aircraft
Pyrometric cone, pyrometric devices that are used to gauge time and temperature during the firing of ceramic materials
Roller cone bit, a drill bit used for drilling through rock, for example when drilling for oil and gas
Skid cone, a hollow steel or plastic cone placed over the sawn end of a log
Speaker cone, the cone inside a loudspeaker that moves to generate sound
Spinning cone columns are used in a form of steam distillation to gently extract volatile chemicals from liquid foodstuffs

Biology and medicine
Cone cell, in anatomy, a type of light-sensitive cell found along with rods in the retina of the eye
Cone dystrophy, an inherited ocular disorder characterized by the loss of cone cells
Cone snail, a carnivorous mollusc of the family Conidae
Cone-billed tanager (Conothraupis mesoleuca), a species of bird in the family Thraupidae
Conifer cone, a seed-bearing organ on conifer plants
Growth cone, a dynamic, actin-supported extension of a developing axon seeking its synaptic target
Witch-hazel cone gall aphid (Hormaphis hamamelidis), a minuscule insect, a member of the aphid superfamily
Coning, a brain herniation in which the cerebellar tonsils move downwards through the foramen magnum

Geography
Cinder cone, a steep conical hill of volcanic fragments around and downwind from a volcanic vent
Cone (hill), a hill in the shape of a cone which may or may not be volcanic in origin
Dirt cone, a feature of a glacier or snow patch, in which dirt forms a coating insulating the ice below
Parasitic cone (or satellite cone), a geographical feature found around a volcano
Shatter cone, rare geological feature in the bedrock beneath meteorite impact craters or underground nuclear explosions
Volcanic cone, among the simplest volcanic formations in the world
Lambert conformal conic projection (LCC), a conic map projection, which is often used for aeronautical charts

Places
Cone (Phrygia), a town and bishopric of ancient Phrygia
Cone, Michigan, an unincorporated community in Michigan
Cone, Texas, an unincorporated community in Crosby County, Texas, United States
Cone Islet, a small granite island in south-eastern Australia
Conical Range, a small mountain range in southwestern British Columbia, Canada, between Seymour Inlet and Belize Inlet

People

Bonnie Ethel Cone (1907–2003), American educator and founder of the University of North Carolina at Charlotte
Carin Cone (born 1940), American swimmer, Olympic medalist, world record holder, and gold medal winner from the Pan American Games
Chadrick Cone (born 1983), American football wide receiver for the Georgia Force in the Arena Football League
Cindy Parlow Cone (born 1978), American soccer player and coach
Cone sisters, Claribel Cone (1864–1929), and Etta Cone (1870–1949), collectors and socialites
David Cone (born 1963), former Major League Baseball pitcher
Edward T. Cone (1917–2004), American music theorist and composer
Fairfax M. Cone (1903–1977), director of the American Association of Advertising Agencies
Fred Cone (baseball) (1848–1909), pioneer professional baseball player
Fred Cone (American football) (born 1926), former professional American football running back
Fred P. Cone (1871–1948), twenty-seventh governor of Florida (Frederick Preston)
Jason McCaslin (born 1980), nicknamed Cone, bassist for the Canadian band Sum 41
James Hal Cone (born 1938), advocate of Black liberation theology
John Cone (born 1974), American professional wrestling referee
John J. Cone, the fourth Supreme Knight of the Knights of Columbus from 1898 to 1899
Mac Cone (born 1952), Canadian show jumper
Martin Cone (1882–1963), 6th president of St. Ambrose College from 1930 to 1937
Marvin Cone (1891–1965), American painter
Moses H. Cone (1857–1908), American textile entrepreneur, conservationist, and philanthropist
Reuben Cone (1788–1851), pioneer and landowner in Atlanta, Georgia
Robert W. Cone (1957-2016), major general in the United States Army, and Special Assistant to the Commanding General of TRADOC
Sara Cone Bryant (1873–?), author of various children's book in the early 20th century
Spencer Cone Jones (1836–1915), President of the Maryland State Senate, Mayor of Rockville, Maryland
Spencer Houghton Cone (1785–1855), American Baptist minister and president of the American and Foreign Bible Society
Tim Cone (born 1957), American basketball coach

Other uses
Conical Asian hat, a simple style of straw hat originating in East and Southeast Asia
Ice cream cone, an edible container in which ice cream is served, shaped like an inverted cone open at its top
Snow cone, a dessert usually made of crushed or shaved ice, flavored with sweet, usually fruit-flavored, brightly colored syrup
Traffic cone, a brightly colored cone-shaped plastic object commonly used as a temporary traffic barrier or warning sign
USS Cone (DD-866), a Gearing-class destroyer of the United States Navy
Elizabethan collar or e-collar, a device to keep an animal from licking or biting itself
To locate an aircraft using a searchlight
Cone Mills Corporation, a textile manufacturer

See also 

Kone (disambiguation)
Colne (disambiguation) (pronounced cone)
Kegel (disambiguation) (German/Dutch translation of cone)